Brian William Pillman (May 22, 1962 – October 5, 1997) was an American professional wrestler and professional football player best known for his appearances in Stampede Wrestling in the 1980s and World Championship Wrestling (WCW), Extreme Championship Wrestling (ECW), and World Wrestling Federation (WWF) in the 1990s.

Pillman created a legacy as "The Loose Cannon", a wrestling gimmick that would see him do a series of worked shoots that would gain him a degree of infamy for his unpredictable character. He was also known for being extremely agile in the ring, although a car accident in April 1996 from which he received extensive ankle injuries limited his in-ring ability. By the end of his career, he worked with his long-time friend and former teammate Stone Cold Steve Austin in a storyline involving a firearm and with The Hart Foundation during the first instances of the developing Attitude Era. In 1997, he died unexpectedly due to an undetected heart disease.

Early life
Pillman was born on May 22, 1962 to a Welsh mother named Mary; he had three sisters named Angie, Linda, and Susan, as well as a brother Phil. His father died of a heart attack when Pillman was three months old in August 1962.

As a child, Pillman developed multiple throat polyps and underwent between 31 and 36 operations to tend to them, many before the age of three. Due to his medical issues Pillman spent a large part of his early childhood in a hospital, only going home for Christmas. Because of this Pillman's mother chose to send him to a public school so that he could spend more time with his friends, which led him to become the only Presbyterian in his otherwise Catholic family. As a child Pillman played many sports, including basketball and hockey, but was rather fragile and was often made fun of by other children because of his raspy voice, which had been damaged by the many operations, this according to his mother prompted him to learn how to box.

Football career

Pillman graduated from Norwood High School in Norwood, Ohio, a suburb of Cincinnati. While attending Miami University in Oxford, Ohio, Pillman played football for  Redskins (now Miami RedHawks) as a defensive tackle where he set the record in the "tackles for loss" category. Pillman struggled academically and needed help with school to continue to play; he was then tutored by Miami rugby player Bill Minnich. A Division I Second-team All-American in his junior year and a Division I All-American in his senior year, he went undrafted in the 1984 NFL Draft. He joined his hometown Cincinnati Bengals as a free agent (where he won the Ed Block Courage Award for his team), and later the Canadian Football League for the Calgary Stampeders in 1986. Pillman also played for the Buffalo Bills in preseason action in 1985, but he was the last player cut before the start of that season. His attempts to make the roster of the Bengals were covered in a series of articles in The Cincinnati Enquirer. Pillman and John Harbaugh, current head coach of the Baltimore Ravens, were roommates and defensive teammates while at Miami.

Professional wrestling career

Stampede Wrestling (1986–1988)
Following the end of his football career, Pillman remained in Canada and began training as a wrestler under Stu Hart and his sons. He debuted in November 1986 in Hart's Calgary-based Stampede Wrestling promotion.

Pillman quickly formed a tag team with Hart's son Bruce known as Bad Company (not to be confused with Badd Company). In April 1987, Bad Company won the Stampede Wrestling International Tag Team Championship by defeating Ron Starr and the Cuban Assassin in the finals of a tournament. Their reign lasted until October 1987, when the titles were held up following a controversial ending to a match between Bad Company and their opponents, Jerry Morrow and Makhan Singh. Bad Company defeated Morrow and Singh in a rematch in November 1987 to regain the titles, eventually losing them to Morrow and the Cuban Assassin in July 1988.

While in Stampede Wrestling, Pillman had his girlfriend at the time, Trisa Hayes, portray his sister in order to get him over as a face by seating her at ringside and having heel wrestlers taunt her so that he could rescue her.

Pillman finished up with Stampede on August 13, 1988, teaming up with Bruce Hart and Jason the Terrible to defeat The Great Gama, Makhan Singh, and Johnny Smith in the main event. He would head to the Continental Wrestling Association in Memphis to continue his career.

After finishing with Stampede Pillman worked briefly in 1989 for New Japan Pro-Wrestling where he wrestled in singles matches against people such as Masa Saito, Tatsumi Fujinami, Black Cat and Naoki Sano as well as in tag team matches with Big Van Vader against Riki Choshu and Tatsumi Fujinami.

World Championship Wrestling (1989–1996)

Flyin' Brian (1989–1993)
In 1989, Pillman returned to the United States and began wrestling for World Championship Wrestling (WCW), where he was known as Flyin' Brian due to his athletic ability and variety of aerial maneuvers. He was one of the first American wrestlers, along with "Beautiful" Bobby Eaton, to incorporate a variety of Mexican lucha libre moves into his arsenal. He held the NWA United States Tag Team Championship with The Z-Man between February 1990 and May 1990. Pillman later feuded with Barry Windham, who he harassed while dressed as the masked Yellow Dog after losing a Loser Leaves WCW (Pillman was eventually reinstated). He also held the short-lived WCW Light Heavyweight Championship twice between October 1991 and February 1992, feuding with Brad Armstrong, Jushin "Thunder" Liger, Richard Morton, and Scotty Flamingo.

Pillman turned heel in September 1992, frustrated by Brad Armstrong's knee injury and vacating the WCW Light Heavyweight title, when he was scheduled to wrestle Armstrong for the title at Clash of the Champions XX. In November 1992, he formed a team with Barry Windham, gunning for the NWA and WCW World Tag Team Championships held by Ricky Steamboat and Shane Douglas. Windham and Pillman lost to Steamboat and Douglas at Starrcade on December 28. Their team lasted until January 1993, as Windham had his sights on the NWA World Heavyweight Championship.

Hollywood Blonds (1993–1994)

Pillman continued the tag team title hunt by forming a tag team with "Stunning" Steve Austin known as the Hollywood Blonds. On the March 27, 1993 episode of Power Hour, the duo won the championships from Steamboat and Douglas. After the feud with Steamboat and Douglas ended, they went on to feud with The Four Horsemen, mainly Ric Flair and Arn Anderson, mocking their ages and parodying Flair's interview show, "A Flair for the Gold", with their own called "A Flair for the Old". They would lose the NWA and WCW World Tag Team Titles to Anderson and Paul Roma at Clash of the Champions XXIV (Lord Steven Regal substituted for Pillman, who suffered a leg injury in a tag team match on an episode of WCW Main Event prior to the Clash of Champions). 

After the Hollywood Blonds separated in October 1993, Pillman became a face, feuding with his old partner Austin. He would also pursue the WCW World Television Championship, held by Lord Steven Regal, with whom he wrestled to a 15-minute time limit draw at Spring Stampede.

In late-1994, Pillman appeared with Extreme Championship Wrestling (ECW) as part of a talent exchange between ECW and WCW. His most notable match there was teaming with Shane Douglas to replace an injured Steve Austin, with Sherri Martel as their manager, in a losing effort to Ron Simmons and 2 Cold Scorpio.

Four Horsemen and "Loose Cannon" (1995–1996) 

After several months of inactivity, Pillman made his return to WCW programming in January 1995, originally to be renamed California Brian (which was scrapped after a week) as a babyface who had moved to California to pursue acting work on Baywatch, with Pillman slowly progressing into a tweener, feuding with wrestlers such as Brad Armstrong, Eddie Guerrero, Alex Wright and Marcus Bagwell by the fall. In September 1995, Pillman formed a team with Arn Anderson and began feuding with Ric Flair. On September 4, 1995, Pillman wrestled the first match on the inaugural episode of Monday Nitro by defeating Jushin "Thunder" Liger in a SuperBrawl II rematch. After costing Flair a match to Arn Anderson at Fall Brawl, Flair recruited the help of Sting to team up against Pillman and Anderson at Halloween Havoc. Pillman and Anderson attacked Flair before the match, forcing Sting to come out alone. When Sting needed a tag the most, Flair came out at the last minute with a bandage on his head, tagged Sting and immediately turned and attacked him removing the fake bandage from his head to show it was all a plan between Pillman, Anderson and Flair from the start. These actions signaled the reuniting of The Four Horsemen. This incarnation was Flair, Anderson, Pillman and Chris Benoit.

Pillman had worked briefly in Japan in 1991 while with WCW but his longest time there was working for New Japan Pro-Wrestling in the middle of 1995 when he participated in the Best of the Super Juniors. When in Japan he wrestled against Dean Malenko, Tatsuhito Takaiwa, Black Cat, Koji Kanemoto, Shinjiro Otani, Gran Hamada, Black Tiger, Wild Pegasus, Alex Wright and El Samurai in singles matches and in tag team matches together with Wright, Norio Honaga, Hamada or Malenko against Akira Nogami, Koji Kanemoto, Takayuki Iizuka, El Samurai, Malenko and Honaga. He also participated in several multi man matches before returning to WCW.

At the end of 1995, Pillman developed his "Loose Cannon" gimmick, cultivating a reputation for unpredictable behavior. During this period of time, Pillman changed his once Hollywood Blond and Flyin' Brian clean athletic look for an edgy, out of control image. Even his allies in the Horsemen, especially Anderson, were wary of his behavior and tried in vain to keep him in check. Almost all of the time Pillman could be seen wearing leather vests, sunglasses, jewelry and graphic T-shirts with skulls, monsters and sayings on them. Pillman frequently blurred fact and fiction with his worked shoots. In a match with Eddie Guerrero on the January 23, 1996 episode of Clash of the Champions XXXII, Pillman grabbed commentator Bobby Heenan by the collar, causing Heenan (who had a history of neck problems) to blurt out "What the fuck are you doing?" live on the air.

Pillman outed Kevin Sullivan as booker during the February 1996 SuperBrawl VI pay-per-view in an I Respect You Strap match where the loser announces that they respect the other wrestler, much like an "I Quit" match. Pillman lost to Sullivan, after Pillman grabbed the microphone and said to Sullivan "I respect you, booker man." The words "booker man" were cut from the commercial tape. The next day after SuperBrawl VI, Pillman was fired by WCW President Eric Bischoff. In Bischoff's autobiography he said that Pillman was fired so that he could go and develop the "loose cannon" gimmick in ECW then return to WCW with more legitimate heat. Bischoff claims it was a plan he and Pillman came up with together. It would later backfire on Bischoff as Pillman did not return.

Extreme Championship Wrestling (1996)
Immediately following his departure from WCW, Pillman returned to ECW and appeared at the promotion's annual Internet convention, ECW CyberSlam, on February 17, 1996. During an interview conducted in the ring by Joey Styles, Pillman insulted Bischoff, calling him a commentator, a "gofer", and a "piece of shit". He turned his attention to the ECW audience, derisively calling them "smart marks". After Styles attempted to end the interview, Pillman threatened to "yank out (his) Johnson" and urinate in the ring. Pillman was confronted by ECW owner Tod Gordon, booker Paul Heyman, and wrestler Shane Douglas, who had him removed from the ring by security guards. While being dragged from the arena, Pillman attacked a plant sitting in the audience with a fork he produced from his boot. Although he did not wrestle for ECW, Pillman made several further appearances with the promotion, engaging in a war of words with Douglas, setting up a proposed feud.

He gained the backstage ire of New Jack when he referred to Jack's tag team with Mustafa Saed as "Niggas with Attitudes" at Fight the Power, a reference to the rap group N.W.A. With his "Loose Cannon" persona, Pillman became the talk of all three major promotions, as he was on his way to the World Wrestling Federation (WWF) after he was scheduled to wrestle Shane Douglas in ECW. On April 15, 1996, Pillman was badly injured after falling asleep while driving his Hummer H1 in Kentucky and driving into a tree trunk, flipping the vehicle. He was in a coma for a week and suffered a shattered ankle, forcing doctors to fuse it together in a fixed walking position and thus forcing Pillman to abandon his previous high-flying wrestling style for a more grounded style.

World Wrestling Federation (1996–1997)

Feud with Stone Cold Steve Austin (1996–1997)
Pillman signed a contract with the WWF on June 10, 1996, with the signing announced in a press conference. He was the second wrestler to sign a guaranteed contract with the WWF after Marc Mero, indicative of the period in which Vince McMahon began to protect the company from abruptly losing talent to WCW, with Lex Luger, Kevin Nash, and Scott Hall all previously doing so. Pillman acted as a commentator while recovering from his broken ankle, transitioning to a wrestling role after attacking an unruly fan during an episode of WWF Superstars on June 29, 1996 in Detroit.

On the November 4, 1996 episode of Raw, Pillman took part in the infamous "Pillman's got a gun" angle with his former teammate Stone Cold Steve Austin. When Pillman initially arrived to the WWF, he aligned himself immediately with his long-time friend and former teammate Austin, serving as his lackey while he recovered. However, Pillman began noticeably favoring Austin's nemesis, Bret Hart, before Austin had enough and brutally attacked him in the ring during an interview on an episode of Superstars on October 27, 1996. Austin and Pillman had been feuding for several weeks, and Austin finally decided to take matters into his own hands and visit Pillman, whom he had already injured, at his home in Walton, Kentucky. WWF interviewer Kevin Kelly sat in Pillman's house with a camera crew and the Pillman family, while Pillman's friends surrounded the house to protect him. As the interview progressed, Pillman got infuriated and produced a Colt-45 pistol, angrily exclaiming, "when Austin 3:16 meets Pillman 9-millimeter glock, I'm gonna blast his sorry ass straight to hell." Austin was attacked by Pillman's friends as soon as he arrived, but he quickly subdued them. He then proceeded to break into Pillman's home and advance on his nemesis. However, Pillman responded by pulling out the pistol and pointing it at a hesitant Austin, while Kelly and Pillman's wife Melanie screamed for help. The camera feed was then disrupted, with the scene fading to black. The on-scene director contacted commentator Vince McMahon and reported that he had heard "a couple explosions". The transmission was restored shortly before the end of Raw, and viewers witnessed Pillman's friends dragging Austin from the house while Pillman aimed the gun at Austin and announced his intention to "kill that son of a bitch!" Pillman also slipped up by saying "get out of the fucking way!" on live television, which prevented it from being edited out. The WWF and Pillman eventually apologized for the entire angle.

Hart Foundation (1997) 

After WrestleMania 13, Pillman returned and aligned himself with his real life close friends Bret Hart, Owen Hart, The British Bulldog, and Jim Neidhart, all of whom he was familiar with from his Stampede Wrestling roots, turning Pillman heel as part of the anti-American Hart Foundation. He began feuding with his former partner, Steve Austin. In the course of the feud, Austin was given on-screen credit for damaging Pillman's ankle in late October 1996 after placing it in between the seat and backrest of a folded chair and then jumping on the chair (this particular style of attack has since been dubbed "The Pillmanizer", in honor of this incident). Pillman began competing again as a full-time in-ring competitor in May, frequently teaming with Hart Foundation members in 6 man tag matches against Austin and the Legion of Doom. On July 6, 1997 at In Your House 16: Canadian Stampede in Bret's hometown Calgary, Pillman and The Hart Foundation defeated the American team of Stone Cold Steve Austin, Goldust, Ken Shamrock and The Legion of Doom in a 10-man tag team match in the main event.

After his feud with Austin, he feuded with Goldust over Marlena until his death. Pillman lost to Goldust at SummerSlam in which Pillman was forced to wear a dress during his matches for a month, Pillman then challenged Goldust again to a match with two stipulations, if Pillman won he would take Marlena away from Goldust to be his personal assistant for 30 days or if Goldust won, Pillman would leave the WWF for the rest of his life. Pillman defeated Goldust at In Your House 17: Ground Zero. This turned out to be his final WWF pay-per-view appearance. During the feud they would for several weeks later appear in segments called "Brian Pillman's XXX-Files", in which Marlena was made to wear sexually provocative clothing. His final WWF televised match came on the October 4, 1997 episode of Shotgun Saturday Night, defeating The Patriot by disqualification due to interference by Goldust. After the match, Goldust chased him and Marlena out of the arena.

Personal life
Pillman was a very close friend to the Hart family. Both Pillman and the Harts have referred to themselves as being as close as siblings. Pillman stated that he loved Bret and Owen enough to be willing to do anything for them. He was the only member of The Hart Foundation to not be related to the family through either blood or marriage.

Pillman dated Terri Runnels while they were in WCW together before her marriage to Dustin Rhodes, which would later be utilized in a 1997 angle between Pillman and Goldust. He later married Melanie Morgan (born September 23, 1965) on March 17, 1993. Melanie had two children at the time, Alexis Michelle Reed and Jesse Morgan from her previous relationships. At the time, he also had daughters, Danielle and Brittany, from two previous relationships. Brian and Melanie had two children together, Brian Zachary and Skylar King, the latter born after Pillman's death. Melanie also adopted one of Brian's daughters, Brittany. Despite not being their biological parent, Pillman is often referred to as the father of Melanie's children, Jesse Morgan and Alexis Michelle Reed. Pillman adopted Alexis before his death.

As per Brian Pillman: Loose Cannon, Brian and Melanie were involved in a heated divorce at the time of his death in October 1997. Melanie has said that she meant for the divorce to be a wake-up call for Brian, and they were still living together at the time of Brian's passing, but he was banished to the basement.

In 2017, Pillman's daughter Brittany claimed that Melanie's daughter Skylar King is not Pillman's biological daughter, but the child of another man whom Melanie married shortly after Pillman's death, and that all the money given by WWF and wrestlers to support Pillman's family was used by Melanie for drugs.

In 2021, Viceland did a two part episode about Pillman on Dark Side of the Ring and life. His sister, son, two daughters, Melanie and NFL Strength Coach Kim Wood talked about Pillman's life. Melanie Pillman was found dead from issues surrounding from years of drug abuse on June 1, 2022, as confirmed by Brian, Jr. She was 56 years old.

Death
On October 5, 1997, Pillman was scheduled to wrestle Dude Love at the WWF pay-per-view In Your House 18: Badd Blood. Steve Austin relayed that Jim Cornette was instructed to find the whereabouts of Pillman. Jim contacted the Budgetel Motel in Bloomington, Minnesota, where Pillman had stayed the previous night, and was told by the receptionist that Pillman was found dead in his hotel room by the maids earlier that day at 1:09 p.m. Central Time. He was 35 years old. An autopsy attributed Pillman's death to a heart attack. However, Austin explained that this was caused by previously undetected atherosclerotic heart disease, a condition which had also led to the death of Pillman's father. The next night on Raw, the WWF paid tribute to Brian Pillman. Later that night, Vince McMahon interviewed Melanie Pillman; the interview was seen as being in poor taste and was awarded Wrestling Observer Newsletters Most Disgusting Promotional Tactic award for that year.

Legacy
In early 2008, Pillman's adopted daughter Alexis Michelle Reed entered professional wrestling as a valet and ring girl under the name "Sexy" Lexi Pillman. On November 26, 2009, Reed died from injuries sustained in an automobile accident. Reed was 26 years old.Lexi Pillman (aka Lexi Reed); Wrestlingdata.com Retrieved September 3, 2016

Like his father, Brian Zachary became a football player and played at the high-school level while attending Dixie Heights High School before graduating in 2011. In February 2017, he announced his decision to follow in his father's footsteps to become a professional wrestler. He added that he wants to follow his father's high-flying style and keep his legacy alive. The younger Pillman was trained by Lance Storm and uses the Twitter handle @FlyinBrianJr as a tribute to his father. He made his debut in December 2017, and is now wrestling for All Elite Wrestling beginning in the summer of 2020, where he, Griff Garrison, and Julia Hart have formed a stable, the Varsity Blondes, paying tribute to the 1980s era and to his father's tag team with Steve Austin.

Championships and accomplishments

Football
 Division I-AA All-American (1983)
 Division I-AA All-American Second-team (1982)
 MAC Defensive Player of the Year (1983)
 Ed Block Courage Award (1984)

Professional wrestling
 World Championship Wrestling WCW Light Heavyweight Championship (2 times)
 WCW World Tag Team Championship (1 time) – with Steve Austin
 NWA World Tag Team Championship (1 time) – with Steve Austin
 NWA United States Tag Team Championship (1 time) – with Tom Zenk
 Pro Wrestling Illustrated Ranked No. 18 of the top 500 singles wrestlers in the PWI 500 in 1993
 Ranked No. 84 of the top 500 singles wrestlers of the "PWI Years" in 2003
 Stampede Wrestling Stampede Wrestling International Tag Team Championship (2 times) – with Bruce Hart
Stampede Wrestling International Tag Team Title Tournament (1987) with Bruce Hart
 Stampede Wrestling Hall of Fame (Class of 1995)
 Wrestling Observer Newsletter Feud of the Year (1997) 
 Most Underrated (1994)
 Rookie of the Year (1987)
 Tag Team of the Year (1993) Canadian Wrestling Hall of Fame'''
Class of 2016

Media
 WCW Superbrawl Wrestling (Video game - SNES, November 1994)
 Legends of Wrestling (Video game - December 3, 2001; May 27, 2002)
 Legends of Wrestling II (Video game - November 2002)
 Showdown: Legends of Wrestling (Video game - June 22, 2004)
 Brian Pillman: Loose Cannon (DVD, September 26, 2006)
 WWE '13 Downloadable Content (Video game, January 2013)
 WWE 2K16 (Video game - October 27, 2015)
 WWE 2K17 (Video game - October 11, 2016)
 Crazy Like A Fox: The Definitive Chronicle of Brian Pillman 20 Years Later (Book - November 5, 2017)

See also
 Brian Pillman Memorial Show
 List of premature professional wrestling deaths

References

Further reading
 Crazy Like a Fox: The Definitive Chronicle of Brian Pillman 20 Years Later by Liam O'Rourke, 2017, ISBN/1-97654-124-7.
 Tributes'' by Dave Meltzer, 2001, .

External links

 
 
 

1962 births
1997 deaths
20th-century American male actors
American football linebackers
American male professional wrestlers
American people of Welsh descent
American Presbyterians
 
Calgary Stampeders players
Cincinnati Bengals players
Converts to Presbyterianism
Ed Block Courage Award recipients
Masked wrestlers
Miami RedHawks football players
People from Cincinnati
People from Walton, Kentucky
Professional wrestlers from Ohio
Sportspeople from Cincinnati
Stampede Wrestling alumni
The Four Horsemen (professional wrestling) members
The Hart Foundation members
Stampede Wrestling International Tag Team Champions
WCW World Tag Team Champions
NWA/WCW United States Tag Team Champions